The Miller–Davis Law Buildings, known commonly as the Miller Davis Building, are located on Main and Front Street in the McLean County, Illinois city of Bloomington. The law offices served future Supreme Court Justice David Davis and future Illinois State Senator Asahel Gridley. The buildings became a gathering place for local lawyers such as Abraham Lincoln and Stephen A. Douglas.

History
Even before the construction of the Miller–Davis Law Buildings in Bloomington, Illinois, the street corner of Main and Front Streets were a popular political rallying point. Stephen A. Douglas and David Davis debated Congressional elections here in 1840. The Miller–Davis Law Buildings were the second and third brick buildings in Bloomington, completed in 1843. Future Illinois Treasurer James T. Miller, a local businessman and land speculator, financed their construction. James Goodheart, William T. H. Miller and Squire Lawrence were tasked with its construction. They are the oldest buildings in the Bloomington Central Business District and the only examples of non-residential 1840s architecture in McLean County.

The offices buildings were used by some the state's most prominent lawyers. The first floor of the Miller building was used as a pharmacy while the second floor was used as law offices. David Davis financed an addition to this building for his own purposes. He practiced law here until he was named to the Illinois Circuit Courts in 1848. Asahel Gridley and John M. Scott practiced in the Miller offices starting in 1848. Among the lawyers known to have met with Davis, Scott, and Gridley are Joshua R. and Jesse W. Fell, William W. Orme, Ward Hill Lamon, James T. Miller, Leonard Swett, Stephen A. Douglas, and Abraham Lincoln.

Notes

Buildings and structures in Bloomington–Normal
National Register of Historic Places in McLean County, Illinois
Commercial buildings on the National Register of Historic Places in Illinois
Law offices
Legal history of Illinois